Parascolopsis rufomaculatus, commonly known as red-spot dwarf monocle bream, is a fish very similar to its close relative Parascolopsis tanyactis, except for the fact that the fourth and fifth dorsal rays are not elongated, and it has a broad golden stripe along the middle of its back. It can be found in the Eastern Indian Ocean.

References 

Nemipteridae
Taxa named by Barry C. Russell
Fish described in 1986